Matteo Ricci (born 18 July 1974 in Pesaro) is an Italian politician.

He is a member of the Democratic Party and he served as President of the Province of Pesaro and Urbino from 2009 to 2014. He was elected Mayor of Pesaro on 25 May 2014 and took office on 30 May. He has been re-elected for a second term in 2019.

See also
2014 Italian local elections
2019 Italian local elections
List of mayors of Pesaro

References

External links
 
 

1974 births
Living people
Mayors of Pesaro
People from Pesaro
Democratic Party (Italy) politicians
Presidents of the Province of Pesaro and Urbino